Clark Township is one of the twenty-two townships of Coshocton County, Ohio, United States. As of the 2010 census the population was 586.

Geography
Located in the northern part of the county, it borders the following townships:
Mechanic Township, Holmes County - northeast
Mill Creek Township - east
Keene Township - southeast corner
Bethlehem Township - south
Jefferson Township - southwest corner
Monroe Township - west
Killbuck Township, Holmes County - northwest

No municipalities are located in Clark Township, although the unincorporated community of Blissfield lies in the southwestern part of the township.

Name and history
Clark Township was organized in 1829. It was named for Samuel Clark, a county commissioner.

Statewide, other Clark Townships are located in Brown, Clinton, and Holmes counties.

Government
The township is governed by a three-member board of trustees, who are elected in November of odd-numbered years to a four-year term beginning on the following January 1. Two are elected in the year after the presidential election and one is elected in the year before it. There is also an elected township fiscal officer, who serves a four-year term beginning on April 1 of the year after the election, which is held in November of the year before the presidential election. Vacancies in the fiscal officership or on the board of trustees are filled by the remaining trustees.

References

External links
County website

Townships in Coshocton County, Ohio
Townships in Ohio